Radanja Vas is a small village near Šentvid pri Stični in the Municipality of Ivančna Gorica in central Slovenia. The area is part of the historical region of Lower Carniola. The municipality is now included in the Central Slovenia Statistical Region. 

A small roadside chapel-shrine in the settlement is dedicated to the Virgin Mary and was built in the early 19th century.

References

External links
Radanja Vas on Geopedia

Populated places in the Municipality of Ivančna Gorica